The  is an electric multiple unit (EMU) commuter train type operated by the private railway operator Odakyu Electric Railway in Japan. First introduced on 10 February 2002, a total of 312 cars were built in eight batches with orders divided between Nippon Sharyo, Tokyu Car Corporation, and Kawasaki Heavy Industries. Originally formed as six- and eight-car trainsets, a further eight cars were built in late 2010 to augment six-car sets to ten cars.

Formations

10-car sets
The 10-car sets, numbered 3081 to 3095, are formed as follows.

The M1, T1, M3, and M5 cars each have one single-arm pantograph.

8-car sets 3651–3665

The M1, T1, and M3 cars each have one single-arm pantograph.

6-car sets 3251–3262

The M1 and M3 cars each have one single-arm pantograph. Sets 3252 to 3254 have wider doors.

6-car sets 3263–3282

The M1 and M3 cars each have one single-arm pantograph.

Interior
Passenger accommodation consists of longitudinal bench seating throughout
.

Livery variations

Doraemon-liveried "F-Train"
In August 2011, 10-car set 3093 was reliveried in a Doraemon livery to commemorate the opening of the Fujiko F. Fujio Museum in Kawasaki, Kanagawa. The train was scheduled to run in its livery for one year, but this was cut short due to complaints from the Tokyo Metropolitan Government that it violated metropolitan ordinances regulating advertising on train exteriors. The decorated "F-Train" remained in service until 30 September 2011, before the exterior advertising was removed.

References

External links

 Odakyu 3000 series, Nippon Sharyo
 Odakyu 3000 series, Tokyu Car Corporation

Electric multiple units of Japan
03000 series
Train-related introductions in 2002
1500 V DC multiple units of Japan
Kawasaki multiple units
Nippon Sharyo multiple units
Tokyu Car multiple units